Salinization is the process of increasing:

 Soil salinity
 Salinity of bodies of water
 Freshwater salinization -- increases in water salinity due to water pollution